Vítor Manuel Andrade Gomes da Costa (born 15 June 1977), commonly known as Toy, is a Cape Verdean former footballer who played as a forward.

Club career
Born in Lisbon, Toy spent the bulk of his professional career in his adopted country, Portugal, first starting in amateur football. In 1999 he signed with Primeira Liga giants S.L. Benfica, but played mainly with its reserves during his two-year spell.

Toy represented mainly S.C. Olhanense, first arriving at the Algarve club in 2004 then returning in summer 2007 after a spell in Saudi Arabia. In the 2008–09 season, in the second division, he contributed with six goals to help his team return to the top flight after a 34-year absence.

In the following three campaigns, Toy was relatively used by Olhanense, mainly as a substitute.

International career
Toy opted to represent Cape Verde internationally, receiving his first callup in May 2008 at nearly 31 years of age.

Club statistics

References

External links

1977 births
Living people
Portuguese people of Cape Verdean descent
Footballers from Lisbon
Cape Verdean footballers
Association football forwards
Primeira Liga players
Liga Portugal 2 players
Segunda Divisão players
S.U. Sintrense players
S.L. Benfica B players
S.L. Benfica footballers
S.C. Salgueiros players
F.C. Felgueiras players
S.C. Olhanense players
Saudi Professional League players
Al-Hazem F.C. players
Al-Qadsiah FC players
Cypriot First Division players
Doxa Katokopias FC players
Cape Verde international footballers
Cape Verdean expatriate footballers
Expatriate footballers in Portugal
Expatriate footballers in Saudi Arabia
Expatriate footballers in Cyprus